The Stage Door Canteen was an entertainment venue for American and Allied servicemen that operated in the Broadway theatre district of New York City throughout World War II. Founded by the American Theatre Wing (ATW) in 1942, the entertainers were largely unpaid; volunteering their talents as a way of supporting the morale of American troops during the war.  Several women in leadership with the ATW played a critical role in establishing the Stage Door Canteen, including  actress Nedda Harrigan and ATW co-founders Louise Heims Beck and Antoinette Perry. The canteen opened March 2, 1942 and operated seven nights a week in the previously unoccupied Little Club under the 44th Street Theatre at 216 West 44th Street in Manhattan.

The official estimate of attendance on the canteen's opening night was 1,250, with 200 "actresses of varying importance" as hostesses and 75 "'name' actors" as busboys.

The canteen's popularity led to the establishment of other canteens throughout the United States as well as London and Paris.

Services 
In addition to shows, the canteen offered off-duty military personnel opportunities to unwind in various ways, including dancing with hostesses and female entertainers, eating, and writing letters home. Food was provided free. Between 5 p.m. and midnight daily, the canteen served 200 gallons of coffee, and 5,000 cigarettes were smoked.

In media 
The original Stage Door Canteen inspired a CBS Radio series (1942–45) and a 1943 film. The film was made by RKO Pathe Studios, using a replica of the New York venue on the studio's Culver City, California, site.

The film This Is the Army (1943) and the Broadway play from which it was adapted include a scene set at the Stage Door Canteen. During that scene, Earl Oxford sang the song "I Left My Heart at the Stage Door Canteen" in both versions. The song "speaks of the fleeting love that many of the men felt when they had to leave the canteen, never to see these beautiful women again." The most popular recorded version of the song was made by Sammy Kaye and his orchestra, with Don Cornell singing. It reached No. 2 on the Billboard chart.

Partial list of performers and public speakers who volunteered at the Stage Door Canteen

A-B

Ruth Aarons
Brian Aherne
Vanoye Aixens
Frank Albanese
Ellen Albertini Dow
Judith Allen
Pauline Alpert
Adrienne Ames
Elaine Anderson Steinbeck
Amy Arnell
 Don Arrès
Jean-Pierre Aumont
Jim Backus
Kenny Baker
Rose Bampton
Billy Banks
Margaret Bannerman
Joe Baque
Irina Baronova
Robert R. Barry
Diana Barrymore
Ethel Barrymore Colt
James Barton
James K. Baxter
Frank Behrens
Ralph Bellamy
Constance Bennett
Pauline Betz
Arthur Blake
Joan Blondell
Margaret Bonds
Victor Borge
Ruthanna Boris
Betty Brewer
Berry Brothers
Betty Bryant
Norman Budd
Billie Burke
Charles Butterworth

C

Maureen Cannon
Una Mae Carlisle
Earl Carroll's Revue
Sid Catlett
Stanley Catron
Ethel Cave-Cole 
Marguerite Chapman
Lucia Chase
George Church
Harry Clark
Tiny Clark
Madeleine Clive
Imogene Coca
Grant Code
Olga Coelho
Eddie Cole
Jack Cole
Emil Coleman and His Orchestra 
Blanche Collins
Jack Collins
Ted Collins
Jerry Colonna
Betty Comden
Perry Como
Frances Comstock
Walter Compton
The Condos Brothers
Billy Conn
Irving Conn
Nadine Conner
Ann Connolly
Ray Conniff
The Continental Trio
Melville Cooper
John Frederick Coots
George Copeland
Peggy Corday
Irwin Corey
Ann Corio
Irene Corlett
Diosa Costello
William Cottrell
Alan Courtney
Diane Courtney
Herbert Cowans
Jeanne Coyne
The Cresta Blanca Carnival 
Cyril Critchlow 
Harold Cromer 
Bob Cronin and his NBC orchestra
Roy Cropper
Milton Cross
Margaret Cuddy
Xavier Cugat
Marion Cumbo
Frank Cunkle

D

Donald Dame
Lili Damita
Danny Daniels
Helene Daniels
Les Damon
Emery Darcy
Jeanne Darrell 
Colette D'Arville
Howard da Silva
Bette Davis
Evelyn Daw
Martha Deane
Deep River Boys
 Carol Deis 
Albert Dekker
Jack De Leon
The DeMarco Sisters
Jacques de Menasce
Clark Dennis
Anita de Palma
Clarence Derwent
Romolo de Spirito
Ragini Devi
Annamary Dickey
Artella Dickson 
Muriel Dickson
 Adam and Jane Di Gatano 
Tommy Dix 
Lee Dixon 
Doris Doe 
Bill Doggett
Anton Dolin
Uncle Don
Doris Doree
Jimmy Dorsey
Tommy Dorsey
Larry Douglas
Helen Dowdy
Jessica Dragonette
Alfred Drake
Ruth Draper
Vernon Duke
Ralph Dumke
Katherine Dunham
Artie Dunn
Jack Dunphy
Bob Dupont
Jack Durant
Ed Durlacher
Eleanor Durkin

E-F

Ed East
Dan Eckley
Ted Eddy and his Orchestra
Dorothy Edwards
Eddie Edwards
Joan Edwards
Kent Edwards
Leo Edwards
Penny Edwards
Maurice Eisenberg
Duke Ellington
Leonard Elliott
Edwina Eustis Dick
Nanette Fabray

G-H

Betty Garrett
Lillian Gish
Benny Goodman
Tiny Hill Orchestra
Alfred Hitchcock
Celeste Holm
Laurel Hurley

I-K

José Iturbi
Chubby Jackson
Dean Jagger
George Jessel
Irene Jordan 
Chandra Kaly and His Dancers
William Kapell
Maria Karnilova
Danny Kaye
Sammy Kaye

L-M

Carole Landis
Betty Lawford
Gertrude Lawrence
Bert Lee
Oscar Levant
Ethel Levey
 Cappy Lewis
Liberace
Dwight Marfield
George Marsh
 Catherine Mastice
Maria Montez

N-O

Cornelia Otis Skinner

P-R

Gregory Ratoff
Marisa Regules

S-T

Akim Tamiroff
Georgie Tapps
Marilyn Taylor Gleason
Jean Tennyson
Joyce Terry
Kay Thompson
Lawrence Tibbett
Sophie Tucker
Frank Tuohy
Kay Twomey

U-W

Fred Uttal
Margaret Valdi Curtis
Astrid Varnay
June Winters
Barry Wood
Peggy Wood
Barbara Woodell 
Ilene Woods 
Monty Woolley 
WQXR Symphony Orchestra
Betty Wragge 
Sonja Wronkow 
Jane Wyman
Keenan Wynn 
Nan Wynn

X-Z

Ben Yost 
Roland Young
Henny Youngman
Alexander Zakin
Don Zelaya
Vera Zorina
George Zoritch

See also
 Hollywood Canteen

References

External links

 History of the Stage Door Canteen

United States home front during World War II